Qeshlaq-e Mashhadi Mohammad (also Romanized as Qeshlāq-e Mashhadī Moḥammad) is a village in Valiabad Rural District, in the Central District of Qarchak County, Tehran Province, Iran. At the 2006 census, its population was 6,923, in 1,569 families.

References 

Populated places in Qarchak County